Kennedy is a talk show hosted by Mary Kennedy. The show aired live on Saturday nights as a summer "filler" between 14 June and 23 August 1997.

References

1997 Irish television series debuts
1997 Irish television series endings
Irish television talk shows
RTÉ original programming